AIHA or Aiha may refer to:

 Agudas Israel Housing Association
 Albany Institute of History & Art
 AIHA Singapore, Singapore Ice Hockey Association
 American Industrial Hygiene Association
 Austrian Ice Hockey Association
 Autoimmune haemolytic anaemia
 Aaiha (or Aiha), village, plain, lake, and temporary wetland in Lebanon
 Aiha script, the writing system of the fictional Kesh language in the novel Always Coming Home by Ursula K. Le Guin